Metatypy  is a type of morphosyntactic and semantic language change brought about by language contact involving multilingual speakers. The term was coined by linguist Malcolm Ross.

Description
Ross (1999: 7, 1) gives the following definition:

[Metatypy is a] change in morphosyntactic type and grammatical organisation [and also semantic patterns] which a language undergoes as a result of its speakers’ bilingualism in another language. This change is driven by grammatical calquing, i.e. the copying of constructional meanings from the modified language and the innovation of new structures using inherited material to express them. A concomitant of this reorganisation of grammatical constructions is often the reorganisation or creation of paradigms of grammatical functors.... Usually, the language undergoing metatypy (the modified language) is emblematic of its speakers’ identity, whilst the language which provides the metatypic model is an inter-community language. Speakers of the modified language form a sufficiently tightknit community to be well aware of their separate identity and of their language as a marker of that identity, but some bilingual speakers, at least, use the inter-community language so extensively that they are more at home in it than in the emblematic language of the community.

Ross (2002) identifies the following metatypic changes:

 "reorganization of the language's semantic patterns and 'ways of saying things'"
 restructuring of its syntax, the patterns of morphemes being concatenated to form
 (i) sentences and clauses,
 (ii) phrases
 (iii) words

Ross finds that semantic reorganization occurs before syntactic restructuring. The syntactic changes occur in the order of (i) sentence/clause, (ii) phrase, and (iii) words.

Here are some languages that have undergone metatypy:

{| border="1" cellpadding="5" style="border-collapse: collapse; background: #f9f9f9; margin: 1em 1em 1em 0; vertical-align: top; border: 1px solid #ccc; line-height: 1.2em;"
|- style="background: #efefef;"
! Modified Language
! Inter-community Language
|-
| Takia (Oceanic)
| Waskia (Trans–New Guinea)
|-
| Anêm (East Papuan)
| Lusi (Oceanic)
|-
| Arvanitic (Albanian, Indo-European)
| Greek (Indo-European)
|- 
| Mixe Basque
| Gascon (Italic)
|- 
| Phan Rang Cham (Malayo-Polynesian)
| Vietnamese (Vietic)
|- 
| Asia Minor Greek (Indo-European)
| Turkish (Turkic)
|- 
| Ilwana (Benue–Congo)
| Orma (Cushitic)
|- 
| Kupwar Kannada (Dravidian)
| Kupwar Marathi (Indo-Iranian)
|- 
| Tariana (Maipurean)
| Tucanoan languages
|-
| Kupwar Urdu (Indo-Iranian)
| Kupwar Marathi (Indo-Iranian)
|}

Example

The example given by Ross (1999) is the "Papuanisation" of the Takia language (of the Oceanic family, western branch) because of influence from the neighbouring Waskia language (of the Madang family, Trans–New Guinea). In Ross' terminology, Takia is the modified language and Waskia is the inter-community language. Waskia, however, does not seem to have been significantly influenced by Takia. Both languages are spoken on Karkar Island.

The end result of the metatypic change leaves Takia usually having a word-for-word Waskia translation such as the following:

{| cellspacing="5"
! English transl.:
| colspan="4" | "the man is hitting me"
|-
! Takia:
| tamol 
| an 
| ŋai 
| i-fun-ag=da
|-
| 
| man 
| DET 
| me 
| he-hit-me=IMP
|-
! Waskia:
| kadi 
| mu 
| aga 
| umo-so
|-
| 
| man 
| DET 
| me 
| hit-PRES.he
|}

The pairing of syntactic and semantic structures makes this word-for-word translation possible. Some of the grammatical changes that Takia has undergone include the following:

{| border="1" cellpadding="5" style="border-collapse: collapse; background: #f9f9f9; margin: 1em 1em 1em 0; vertical-align: top; border: 1px solid #ccc; line-height: 1.2em;"
|- style="background: #efefef;"
! Metatypic Change
! Early Western Oceanic
!  
! Papuanised Takia
|-
! style="text-align: left; background: #efefef;" | word order:
| SVO 
| → 
| SOV
|-
! style="text-align: left; background: #efefef;" | non-deictic determiner: 
| precedes head noun 
| → 
| follows head
|-
! style="text-align: left; background: #efefef;" | attributive noun: 
| precedes head 
| → 
| follows head
|-
! style="text-align: left; background: #efefef;" | conjoined noun phrase: 
| Noun Phrase + Conjunction + Noun Phrase 
| → 
| Noun Phrase + Noun Phrase + Postposition
|-
! style="text-align: left; background: #efefef;" | adposition:
| preposition
| →
| postposition
|}

The diffusional changes of Takia are only in terms of metatypy: Takia has not altered its phonology and has virtually no loanwords borrowed from Waskia.

See also

 Calque
 Mixed language
 Language change
 Language contact
 Loanword
 Multilingualism
 Language transfer
 Relexification
 Hybrid language (disambiguation)

Sources

 
 
 
 
 
 
 
 
 

Historical linguistics